Muñiz is a town located in San Miguel Partido of Buenos Aires Province, Argentina. It forms part of the urban conurbation of Greater Buenos Aires.

References

External links

Populated places in Buenos Aires Province
San Miguel Partido
Cities in Argentina